Pal is a town and former princely state in Gujarat, western India.

History 
Pal was a Fifth Class princely state, comprising four more villages, covering twenty-two square miles in Halar prant of Western Kathiawar.

It had a combined population of 1,359 in 1901, yielding a state revenue of 17,836 Rupees (1903-4, over half from land), paying a tribute of 1,647 Rupees to the British and Junagarh State.
\

Ruler starts - Prithviraj Singh

References 

Princely states of Gujarat
Rajput princely states